Italo Mattioli (born April 17, 1985 in Aversa) is an Italian professional football player .

He played 2 games in the Serie A in the 2004/05 season for U.S. Lecce. In January 2011 he signed a short-term contract with Latina.

References

External links
 

1985 births
Living people
Italian footballers
Serie A players
Serie B players
Calcio Foggia 1920 players
U.S. Lecce players
U.S. Catanzaro 1929 players
U.S. Salernitana 1919 players
Taranto F.C. 1927 players
A.C. Legnano players
Association football forwards